The 2008 FIBA Africa Basketball Club Championship (23rd edition), was an international basketball tournament  held in Sousse and Hammam, Tunisia, from December 12 to 21, 2008. The tournament, organized by FIBA Africa, and hosted by Étoile Sportive du Sahel, was contested by 12 teams split into 2 groups of 6, the first four of which qualifying for the knock-out stage, quarter, semifinals and final.
 
The tournament was won by Primeiro de Agosto from Angola, thus successfully retaining its title.

Qualification

Draw

Squads

Preliminary round
Times given below are in UTC+1.

Group A

Group B

Knockout stage

Quarter-finals

9th-12th place

5th-8th place

Semifinals

11th place

9th place

7th place

5th place

Bronze medal game

Gold medal game

Final standings

Primeiro de Agosto rosterMayzer Alexandre, Armando Costa, Adilson Baza, Olímpio Cipriano, Joaquim Gomes, Felizardo Ambrósio, Vladimir Ricardino, Francisco Jordão, Simão João, Carlos Almeida, Miguel Lutonda, Rodrigo Mascarenhas Coach: Luís Magalhães

Statistical Leaders

All Tournament Team

See also 
 2009 FIBA Africa Championship

References

External links 
 2008 FIBA Africa Champions Cup Official Website
 FIBA Africa official website

2008 FIBA Africa Basketball Club Championship
2008 FIBA Africa Basketball Club Championship
2008 FIBA Africa Basketball Club Championship
International basketball competitions hosted by Tunisia